Madison Bertrand “Bert” Pearson (March 22, 1905 – May 1, 1945) was a professional American football player. Pearson played eight years in the National Football League, mainly for the Chicago Bears. He was an offensive lineman. He was born in Manhattan, Kansas.

References
Bert Pearson's profile at NFL.com
Bert Pearson's obituary

1905 births
1945 deaths
Sportspeople from Manhattan, Kansas
American football centers
Kansas State Wildcats football players
Chicago Bears players
Chicago Cardinals players